Why Hasn't Everything Already Disappeared? is the eighth studio album by the American indie rock band Deerhunter. It was released on January 18, 2019, on 4AD. The album was co-produced by singer-songwriter Cate Le Bon, Ben H. Allen (who had previously worked with the band on Halcyon Digest and Fading Frontier), Ben Etter (who worked as a studio assistant on Fading Frontier) and the band itself. The first single, "Death in Midsummer", was released on October 30, 2018. The same day, a world tour in support of the album was announced, starting on November 4, 2018. The second single from the album, "Element", was released on December 6, 2018. The album leaked on December 12, 2018.

Lead singer Bradford Cox described the album as a "science fiction album about the present."

Title
The album's title is a reference to the posthumously published book of the same name by French philosopher Jean Baudrillard. Bradford Cox explained that he was "attracted less to the content of the book and more to this idea of a philosopher who spends his entire career predicting the disappearance of [culture], and then, on his deathbed, realizes it hasn't completely happened on its own during his lifetime. There's something sad and infinitely melancholy about that." Cox described the title as a "beautiful picture frame" for the songs he wrote for the album.

Accolades

Track listing

Personnel 
Credits adapted from the 4AD website, except where noted.

Deerhunter
 Bradford Cox – vocals; electric and acoustic guitars; synthesizer; percussion; auxiliary drums; piano; Chamberlin; tapes; mandolin
 Lockett Pundt – electric, acoustic, slide, and twelve string guitars; organ; piano; mandolin; electric harpsichord; synthesizer; vocals 
 Moses Archuleta – drums; synthesizer; mandolin
 Josh McKay – bass; marimba; piano, contrabass, electric piano; bells
 Javier Morales – piano; electric piano; Chamberlin; tenor saxophone; marimba; bass synthesizer; bass clarinet; contrabass

Additional musicians
 Cate Le Bon – harpsichord on "Death in Midsummer", vocals on "Tarnung", mandolin on "No One's Sleeping"
 Tim Presley – abstract lead guitar on "Futurism"
 Ben H. Allen III – synthetic bass system on "Plains"
 Ian Horrocks – contrabass on "Nocturne"
 James Cox – bass vocals on "Element"

Technical
 Ben Etter – engineering, mixing
 Samur Khouja – engineering
 Ben H. Allen III – mixing
 Bradford Cox – engineering, mixing
 Heba Kadry – mastering

Charts

References 

2019 albums
Deerhunter albums
4AD albums
Albums recorded at Sonic Ranch
Albums produced by Cate Le Bon
Albums produced by Ben H. Allen